The Fall River is a  stream in northeastern Minnesota, the United States. It drops  in elevation to Lake Superior over the final  of its course.

See also
List of rivers of Minnesota

References

Minnesota Watersheds
USGS Hydrologic Unit Map - State of Minnesota (1974)

Rivers of Minnesota
Tributaries of Lake Superior